In mathematics Haboush's theorem, often still referred to as the Mumford conjecture, states that for any semisimple algebraic group G over a field K, and for any linear representation ρ of G on a K-vector space V, given v ≠ 0 in V that is fixed by the action of G, there is a G-invariant polynomial F on V, without constant term,  such that

F(v) ≠ 0.

The polynomial can be taken to be homogeneous, in other words an element of a symmetric power of the dual of V, and if the characteristic is p>0 the degree of the polynomial can be taken to be a power of p.
When K has characteristic 0 this was well known; in fact Weyl's theorem on the complete reducibility of the representations of G implies that F can even be taken to be linear.

Applications
Haboush's theorem can be used to generalize results of geometric invariant theory from characteristic 0, where they were already known, to characteristic p>0. In particular Nagata's earlier results together with Haboush's theorem show that if a reductive group (over an algebraically closed field) acts on a finitely generated algebra then the fixed subalgebra is also finitely generated.

Haboush's theorem implies that if G is a reductive algebraic group acting regularly on an affine algebraic variety, then disjoint closed invariant sets X and Y can be separated by an invariant function f (this means that f is 0 on X and 1 on Y).

C.S. Seshadri (1977) extended Haboush's theorem to reductive groups over schemes.

G is reductive (its unipotent radical is trivial).
For any non-zero invariant vector in a rational representation of G, there is an invariant homogeneous polynomial that does not vanish on it.
For any finitely generated K algebra on which G act rationally, the algebra of fixed elements is finitely generated.

Proof
The theorem is proved in several steps as follows:
We can assume that the group is defined over an algebraically closed field K of characteristic p>0.
Finite groups are easy to deal with as one can just take a product over all elements, so one can reduce to the case of connected reductive groups (as the connected component has finite index). By taking a central extension which is harmless one can also assume the group G is simply connected.
Let A(G) be the coordinate ring of G. This is a representation of G with G acting by left translations. Pick an element v′ of the dual of V that has value 1 on the invariant vector v. The map V to A(G) by sending w∈V to the element a∈A(G) with a(g) = v′(g(w)). This sends v to 1∈A(G), so we can assume that V⊂A(G) and v=1.
The structure of the representation A(G) is given as follows. Pick a maximal torus T of G, and let it act on  A(G) by right translations (so that it commutes with the action of G). Then A(G) splits as a sum over characters λ of T of the subrepresentations A(G)λ of elements transforming according to λ. So we can assume that V is contained in the T-invariant subspace A(G)λ of A(G).
The representation A(G)λ is an increasing union of subrepresentations of the form Eλ+nρ⊗Enρ, where ρ is the Weyl vector for a choice of simple roots of T, n is a positive integer, and Eμ is the space of sections of the line bundle over G/B corresponding to a character μ of T, where B is a Borel subgroup containing T.
If n is sufficiently large then Enρ has dimension (n+1)N where N is the number of positive roots. This is because in characteristic 0 the corresponding module has this dimension by the Weyl character formula, and for n large enough that the line bundle over G/B is very ample, Enρ has the same dimension as in characteristic 0.
If q=pr  for a positive integer r, and n=q−1, then Enρ contains the Steinberg representation of G(Fq) of dimension qN. (Here Fq ⊂ K is the finite field of order q.) The Steinberg representation is an irreducible representation of G(Fq) and therefore of G(K), and for r large enough it has the same dimension as Enρ, so there are infinitely many values of n such that Enρ is irreducible.
If Enρ is irreducible it is isomorphic to its dual, so Enρ⊗Enρ is isomorphic to End(Enρ). Therefore, the T-invariant subspace A(G)λ of A(G) is an increasing union of subrepresentations of the form End(E) for representations E (of the form E(q−1)ρ)). However, for representations of the form End(E)  an invariant polynomial that separates 0 and 1 is given by the determinant. This completes the sketch of the proof of Haboush's theorem.

References
 

Mumford, D.; Fogarty, J.; Kirwan, F. Geometric invariant theory. Third edition. Ergebnisse der Mathematik und ihrer Grenzgebiete (2) (Results in Mathematics and Related Areas (2)), 34. Springer-Verlag, Berlin, 1994. xiv+292 pp.  

Representation theory of algebraic groups
Invariant theory
Theorems in representation theory
Conjectures that have been proved